Jialing Avenue Subdistrict is a subdistrict in western Nankai District, Tianjin, China. It shares border Xiangyang Road and Changhong Subdistricts to its north, Wanxing Subdistrict to its east, Wangdingdi Subdistrict to its south, and Zhongbei Town in its west. The population for this subdistrict was 102,405 as of the 2010 census.

The region was developed into a residential area in 1976, formed as Changjiang Avenue Subdistrict in 1981, and renamed to Jialing Avenue in 1984.

Geography 
Jialing Avenue subdistrict is located on the eastern bank of Chentaizi Paishui River. Chentangzhuang Branch Railway passes through the western portion of the subdistrict.

Administrative divisions 
By the end of 2021, Jialing Avenue Subdistrict comprised these 16 residential communities:

Gallery

References 

Township-level divisions of Tianjin
Nankai District, Tianjin